"Everybody Knows" is a country–pop song written and performed by the American band Dixie Chicks.  It was released as the second physical single from their seventh studio album, Taking the Long Way (2006).

Song information 
The song, which was written in collaboration with Gary Louris, is about the consequences that fame and success has on the lives of a celebrity.

Covers 
The song was covered by co-writer Louris's alt-country band the Jayhawks on their 2018 album Back Roads and Abandoned Motels.

Scottish rock band Gun recorded a cover of the song in 2016, as part of the re-release of their album Frantic. The song was later included on their best-of compilation R3L0ADED in 2019.

Chart performance

References

2006 singles
The Chicks songs
Song recordings produced by Rick Rubin
Songs written by Martie Maguire
Songs written by Emily Robison
Songs written by Natalie Maines
Columbia Records singles